Rubén Anguiano (17 November 1950 – 28 September 2020) was a Mexican footballer who played as a midfielder.

Career
Born in Mexico City, Anguiano played for Zacatepec, Leones Negros and Atlante.

He earned 8 caps for the Mexico national football team from 1974 to 1977.

He died on 28 September 2020, aged 69, from COVID-19 during the COVID-19 pandemic in Mexico.

References

1955 births
2020 deaths
Mexican footballers
Mexico international footballers
Atlético Zacatepec footballers
Leones Negros UdeG footballers
Atlante F.C. footballers
Association football midfielders
Deaths from the COVID-19 pandemic in Mexico
Footballers from Mexico City
Liga MX players